Ben Drinkwater (Reuben Thomas Drinkwater, 13 February 1910 – 9 June 1949) born in Rochdale, Lancashire, England, was a railway signalman and motorcycle racer who competed in the Isle of Man TT races and the Manx Grand Prix.

After riding in the 1946 Manx Grand Prix, the first post-war event on the Snaefell Mountain Course, Ben Drinkwater returned to race in the 1947 Isle of Man TT, finishing in third place in the controversial 1947 250 cc Lightweight TT race won by Manliff Barrington.

While competing in the 1949 350cc Junior TT race, the first ever race of the new FIM World Championship, Drinkwater collided with a bank trying to avoid a fellow competitor near Cronk Bane farm, close to the 11th milestone marker post, and was killed. The distinctive S-bend corner on the Mountain Course near to the accident location was renamed "Drinkwater's Bend" or the 11th Milestone.

TT career summary

Sources

External links
 TT database rider profile iomtt.com
 TT database TT results iomtt.com

1910 births
1949 deaths
Sportspeople from Rochdale
English motorcycle racers
350cc World Championship riders
Manx Grand Prix racers
Isle of Man TT riders
Motorcycle racers who died while racing
Sport deaths in the Isle of Man